The Sverdlovsk constituency (No.168) is a Russian legislative constituency in Sverdlovsk Oblast. Until 2007 the constituency covered western half of Yekaterinburg, however, after 2015 redistricting the constituency was expanded to Yekaterinburg satellite cities of Verkhnyaya Pyshma and Sredneuralsk.

Members elected

Election results

1993

|-
! colspan=2 style="background-color:#E9E9E9;text-align:left;vertical-align:top;" |Candidate
! style="background-color:#E9E9E9;text-align:left;vertical-align:top;" |Party
! style="background-color:#E9E9E9;text-align:right;" |Votes
! style="background-color:#E9E9E9;text-align:right;" |%
|-
|style="background-color:#0085BE"|
|align=left|Larisa Mishustina
|align=left|Choice of Russia
|
|26.73%
|-
|style="background-color:"|
|align=left|Oleg Dolganov
|align=left|Independent
| -
|18.52%
|-
| colspan="5" style="background-color:#E9E9E9;"|
|- style="font-weight:bold"
| colspan="3" style="text-align:left;" | Total
| 
| 100%
|-
| colspan="5" style="background-color:#E9E9E9;"|
|- style="font-weight:bold"
| colspan="4" |Source:
|
|}

1995

|-
! colspan=2 style="background-color:#E9E9E9;text-align:left;vertical-align:top;" |Candidate
! style="background-color:#E9E9E9;text-align:left;vertical-align:top;" |Party
! style="background-color:#E9E9E9;text-align:right;" |Votes
! style="background-color:#E9E9E9;text-align:right;" |%
|-
|style="background-color:"|
|align=left|Yevgeny Zyablitsev
|align=left|Independent
|
|29.91%
|-
|style="background-color:#3A46CE"|
|align=left|Larisa Mishustina (incumbent)
|align=left|Democratic Choice of Russia – United Democrats
|
|20.88%
|-
|style="background-color:#CE1100"|
|align=left|Aleksandr Tatarkin
|align=left|My Fatherland
|
|7.60%
|-
|style="background-color:"|
|align=left|Oleg Dolganov
|align=left|Democratic Alternative
|
|5.83%
|-
|style="background-color:#2C299A"|
|align=left|Viktor Chepulyanis
|align=left|Congress of Russian Communities
|
|4.86%
|-
|style="background-color:"|
|align=left|Natalya Ponomareva
|align=left|Independent
|
|3.31%
|-
|style="background-color:"|
|align=left|Aleksey Kutsev
|align=left|Liberal Democratic Party
|
|2.85%
|-
|style="background-color:"|
|align=left|Aleksandr Mironov
|align=left|Independent
|
|2.09%
|-
|style="background-color:"|
|align=left|Gennady Kazakov
|align=left|Independent
|
|1.81%
|-
|style="background-color:#DD137B"|
|align=left|Boris Guseletov
|align=left|Social Democrats
|
|1.72%
|-
|style="background-color:"|
|align=left|Aleksandr Sazonov
|align=left|Independent
|
|0.92%
|-
|style="background-color:#000000"|
|colspan=2 |against all
|
|16.03%
|-
| colspan="5" style="background-color:#E9E9E9;"|
|- style="font-weight:bold"
| colspan="3" style="text-align:left;" | Total
| 
| 100%
|-
| colspan="5" style="background-color:#E9E9E9;"|
|- style="font-weight:bold"
| colspan="4" |Source:
|
|}

1999
A by-election was scheduled after Against all line received the most votes.

|-
! colspan=2 style="background-color:#E9E9E9;text-align:left;vertical-align:top;" |Candidate
! style="background-color:#E9E9E9;text-align:left;vertical-align:top;" |Party
! style="background-color:#E9E9E9;text-align:right;" |Votes
! style="background-color:#E9E9E9;text-align:right;" |%
|-
|style="background-color:"|
|align=left|Larisa Mishustina
|align=left|Yabloko
|
|20.33%
|-
|style="background-color:"|
|align=left|Igor Kovpak
|align=left|Independent
|
|20.33%
|-
|style="background-color:"|
|align=left|Vyacheslav Teplyakov
|align=left|Communist Party
|
|7.52%
|-
|style="background-color:"|
|align=left|Yury Samarin
|align=left|Independent
|
|5.62%
|-
|style="background-color:"|
|align=left|Yury Alekseyev
|align=left|Independent
|
|4.45%
|-
|style="background-color:"|
|align=left|Vladislav Kavtrev
|align=left|Independent
|
|3.90%
|-
|style="background-color:"|
|align=left|Vladimir Zelenkov
|align=left|Independent
|
|2.60%
|-
|style="background-color:#FF4400"|
|align=left|Aleksandr Kobelev
|align=left|Andrey Nikolayev and Svyatoslav Fyodorov Bloc
|
|2.36%
|-
|style="background-color:#084284"|
|align=left|Sergey Rybakov
|align=left|Spiritual Heritage
|
|1.82%
|-
|style="background-color:"|
|align=left|Vladimir Dmitriyev
|align=left|Russian All-People's Union
|
|1.22%
|-
|style="background-color:#020266"|
|align=left|Valery Zimin
|align=left|Russian Socialist Party
|
|0.84%
|-
|style="background-color:"|
|align=left|Vladimir Sokovnin
|align=left|Independent
|
|0.62%
|-
|style="background-color:#000000"|
|colspan=2 |against all
|
|23.60%
|-
| colspan="5" style="background-color:#E9E9E9;"|
|- style="font-weight:bold"
| colspan="3" style="text-align:left;" | Total
| 
| 100%
|-
| colspan="5" style="background-color:#E9E9E9;"|
|- style="font-weight:bold"
| colspan="4" |Source:
|
|}

2000

|-
! colspan=2 style="background-color:#E9E9E9;text-align:left;vertical-align:top;" |Candidate
! style="background-color:#E9E9E9;text-align:left;vertical-align:top;" |Party
! style="background-color:#E9E9E9;text-align:right;" |Votes
! style="background-color:#E9E9E9;text-align:right;" |%
|-
|style="background-color:"|
|align=left|Yevgeny Zyablitsev
|align=left|Independent
|
|32.24%
|-
|style="background-color:"|
|align=left|Igor Kovpak
|align=left|Independent
|
|23.02%
|-
|style="background-color:"|
|align=left|Anatoly Churkin
|align=left|Independent
|
|8.82%
|-
|style="background-color:"|
|align=left|Pavel Fedulev
|align=left|Independent
|
|5.29%
|-
|style="background-color:"|
|align=left|Vladimir Dmitriyev
|align=left|Independent
|
|3.34%
|-
|style="background-color:#000000"|
|colspan=2 |against all
|
|23.58%
|-
| colspan="5" style="background-color:#E9E9E9;"|
|- style="font-weight:bold"
| colspan="3" style="text-align:left;" | Total
| 
| 100%
|-
| colspan="5" style="background-color:#E9E9E9;"|
|- style="font-weight:bold"
| colspan="4" |Source:
|
|}

2003
A by-election was scheduled after Against all line received the most votes.

|-
! colspan=2 style="background-color:#E9E9E9;text-align:left;vertical-align:top;" |Candidate
! style="background-color:#E9E9E9;text-align:left;vertical-align:top;" |Party
! style="background-color:#E9E9E9;text-align:right;" |Votes
! style="background-color:#E9E9E9;text-align:right;" |%
|-
|style="background-color:#FFD700"|
|align=left|Yevgeny Zyablitsev (incumbent)
|align=left|People’s Party
|
|21.58%
|-
|style="background-color:"|
|align=left|Nikolay Timofeyev
|align=left|Independent
|
|16.88%
|-
|style="background-color:"|
|align=left|Aleksandr Bogachev
|align=left|Independent
|
|12.51%
|-
|style="background-color:"|
|align=left|Maria Dronova
|align=left|Yabloko
|
|6.30%
|-
|style="background-color:"|
|align=left|Eduard Khudyakov
|align=left|Independent
|
|5.09%
|-
|style="background-color:"|
|align=left|Aleksey Zyablitsev
|align=left|Independent
|
|3.26%
|-
|style="background-color:"|
|align=left|Aleksey Starikov
|align=left|Independent
|
|2.64%
|-
|style="background-color:"|
|align=left|Vladimir Taskayev
|align=left|Liberal Democratic Party
|
|2.19%
|-
|style="background-color:#164C8C"|
|align=left|Sergey Kolosovsky
|align=left|United Russian Party Rus'
|
|1.17%
|-
|style="background-color:"|
|align=left|Oleg Shumovsky
|align=left|Independent
|
|0.70%
|-
|style="background-color:"|
|align=left|Yury Chukharev
|align=left|Independent
|
|0.65%
|-
|style="background-color:"|
|align=left|Andrey Chuprov
|align=left|Independent
|
|0.40%
|-
|style="background-color:"|
|align=left|Anatoly Neuymin
|align=left|Independent
|
|0.27%
|-
|style="background-color:#000000"|
|colspan=2 |against all
|
|23.03%
|-
| colspan="5" style="background-color:#E9E9E9;"|
|- style="font-weight:bold"
| colspan="3" style="text-align:left;" | Total
| 
| 100%
|-
| colspan="5" style="background-color:#E9E9E9;"|
|- style="font-weight:bold"
| colspan="4" |Source:
|
|}

2004

|-
! colspan=2 style="background-color:#E9E9E9;text-align:left;vertical-align:top;" |Candidate
! style="background-color:#E9E9E9;text-align:left;vertical-align:top;" |Party
! style="background-color:#E9E9E9;text-align:right;" |Votes
! style="background-color:#E9E9E9;text-align:right;" |%
|-
|style="background-color:"|
|align=left|Yevgeny Zyablitsev
|align=left|Independent
|
|32.10%
|-
|style="background-color:"|
|align=left|Vasily Shandybin
|align=left|Communist Party
|
|8.79%
|-
|style="background-color:"|
|align=left|Nikolay Timofeyev
|align=left|Independent
|
|8.27%
|-
|style="background-color:"|
|align=left|Konstantin Tsybko
|align=left|Independent
|
|5.63%
|-
|style="background-color:"|
|align=left|Yury Kuznetsov
|align=left|Independent
|
|5.17%
|-
|style="background-color:"|
|align=left|Oleg Lazarev
|align=left|Independent
|
|3.14%
|-
|style="background-color:"|
|align=left|Vladimir Taskayev
|align=left|Liberal Democratic Party
|
|2.70%
|-
|style="background-color:"|
|align=left|Aleksey Zyablitsev
|align=left|Independent
|
|2.69%
|-
|style="background-color:#D50000"|
|align=left|Natalya Rosseykina
|align=left|Russian Communist Workers Party-Russian Party of Communists
|
|2.24%
|-
|style="background-color:"|
|align=left|Nikolay Volkov
|align=left|Independent
|
|1.67%
|-
|style="background-color:"|
|align=left|Andrey Timofeyev
|align=left|Independent
|
|0.63%
|-
|style="background-color:#000000"|
|colspan=2 |against all
|
|23.61%
|-
| colspan="5" style="background-color:#E9E9E9;"|
|- style="font-weight:bold"
| colspan="3" style="text-align:left;" | Total
| 
| 100%
|-
| colspan="5" style="background-color:#E9E9E9;"|
|- style="font-weight:bold"
| colspan="4" |Source:
|
|}

2016

|-
! colspan=2 style="background-color:#E9E9E9;text-align:left;vertical-align:top;" |Candidate
! style="background-color:#E9E9E9;text-align:leftt;vertical-align:top;" |Party
! style="background-color:#E9E9E9;text-align:right;" |Votes
! style="background-color:#E9E9E9;text-align:right;" |%
|-
| style="background-color: " |
|align=left|Andrey Alshevskikh
|align=left|United Russia
|
|38.67%
|-
| style="background-color: " |
|align=left|Valery Chereshnev
|align=left|A Just Russia
|
|18.66%
|-
|style="background-color:"|
|align=left|Rimma Skomorokhova
|align=left|Communist Party
|
|10.61%
|-
|style="background-color:"|
|align=left|Denis Sizov
|align=left|Liberal Democratic Party
|
|9.17%
|-
|style="background-color:"|
|align=left|Vladimir Shabanov
|align=left|Rodina
|
|4.66%
|-
|style="background-color:"|
|align=left|Feliks Rivkin
|align=left|People's Freedom Party
|
|4.49%
|-
|style="background-color: " |
|align=left|Denis Gayev
|align=left|The Greens
|
|4.22%
|-
|style="background-color: " |
|align=left|Sergey Zaytsev
|align=left|Communists of Russia
|
|3.05%
|-
| colspan="5" style="background-color:#E9E9E9;"|
|- style="font-weight:bold"
| colspan="3" style="text-align:left;" | Total
| 
| 100%
|-
| colspan="5" style="background-color:#E9E9E9;"|
|- style="font-weight:bold"
| colspan="4" |Source:
|
|}

2021

|-
! colspan=2 style="background-color:#E9E9E9;text-align:left;vertical-align:top;" |Candidate
! style="background-color:#E9E9E9;text-align:left;vertical-align:top;" |Party
! style="background-color:#E9E9E9;text-align:right;" |Votes
! style="background-color:#E9E9E9;text-align:right;" |%
|-
|style="background-color: " |
|align=left|Andrey Alshevskikh (incumbent)
|align=left|United Russia
|
|32.94%
|-
|style="background-color: " |
|align=left|Vladislav Postnikov
|align=left|Yabloko
|
|12.96%
|-
|style="background-color:"|
|align=left|Oksana Ivanova
|align=left|A Just Russia — For Truth
|
|12.79%
|-
|style="background-color:"|
|align=left|Rimma Skomorokhova
|align=left|Communist Party
|
|11.24%
|-
|style="background-color:"|
|align=left|Nikolay Nikolayev
|align=left|New People
|
|9.90%
|-
|style="background-color: " |
|align=left|Dmitry Zenov
|align=left|Communists of Russia
|
|4.92%
|-
|style="background-color:"|
|align=left|Sergey Prokofyev
|align=left|Liberal Democratic Party
|
|4.20%
|-
|style="background-color: "|
|align=left|Vladimir Avdiysky
|align=left|Party of Pensioners
|
|4.04%
|-
|style="background-color:"|
|align=left|Sergey Yusupov
|align=left|Rodina
|
|1.63%
|-
| colspan="5" style="background-color:#E9E9E9;"|
|- style="font-weight:bold"
| colspan="3" style="text-align:left;" | Total
| 
| 100%
|-
| colspan="5" style="background-color:#E9E9E9;"|
|- style="font-weight:bold"
| colspan="4" |Source:
|
|}

Notes

References

Russian legislative constituencies
Politics of Sverdlovsk Oblast